Osika is a Slavic surname. Notable people with the surname include:

 Craig Osika (born 1979), American football player
 Ron Osika (born 1939), Canadian politician

See also
 Osaka (surname)
 

Czech-language surnames
Polish-language surnames